Delinquent or delinquents may refer to:

 A person who commits a felony
 A juvenile delinquent, often shortened as delinquent is a young person (under 18) who  fails to do that which is required by law; see juvenile delinquency
 A person who fails to pay a debt or other financial obligation
 A person found guilty of serious misconduct, gross abuse of position, gross negligence, wilful misconduct or a breach of trust, can be declared a delinquent director (South Africa, by example) by the court

Other 
 The Delinquents (1989 film), an Australian film directed by Chris Thomson starring Kylie Minogue and Charlie Schlatter
 Delinquent (royalist)
 The Delinquents (group), a rap group from Oakland, California

See also 
 The Delinquents (disambiguation)